The molecular formula C6H6N2O may refer to:

 Acetylpyrazine, an organic compound; a pyrazine and a ketone
 Isonicotinamide, the amide form of isonicotinic acid; an isomer of nicotinamide
 Nicotinamide, a form of vitamin B3 found in food, used as a dietary supplement and medication